Moneydig Presbyterian Church is a church building of the Coleraine and Limavady presbytery of the Presbyterian Church in Ireland. It is located outside Garvagh, County Londonderry, Northern Ireland.

History
Moneydig Presbyterian Church was established in 1836 as part of the Synod of Ulster. The current church building was complete the same year. The congregation was created from parts of the adjoining parishes of Aghadowey, Garvagh and Kilrea. The current minister is the Rev James Richard Ian Harbinson who was installed on 27 June 2008.

Organisations
 Campaigners
 Moneydig Bowling Club
 Presbyterian Women
 Crèche
 Sunday School
 Youth Club
 Youth Fellowship

See also
 Presbyterian Church in Ireland
 Garvagh

References

External links
 Moneydig Presbyterian Church
 Genealogical Information  - moneydigpci.org.uk
 Presbyterian Church in Ireland

Churches in County Londonderry
Presbyterian churches in Northern Ireland
1836 establishments in Ireland